Dibutylmagnesium is an organometallic chemical compound of magnesium. Dibutylmagnesium is a chemical compound from the group of organomagnesium compounds. The pure substance is a waxy solid. Commercially, it is marketed as solution in heptane.

Synthesis
Dibutylmagnesium can be obtained by reaction of butyllithium with magnesium butylchloride and subsequent addition of magnesium 2-ethylhexanoate. The compound can also be prepared by hydrogenation of magnesium, followed by reaction with 1-butene. It is also possible to prepare dibutylmagnesium using 2-chlorobutane, magnesium powder, and n-butyllithium.

Use
Dibutylmagnesium is used as a convenient reagent for the preparation of organomagnesium compounds.

References

Magnesium compounds
Organomagnesium compounds